Himangshu Mohan Choudhury is an Indian civil servant who is credited with efforts in providing relief to the refugees and army deserters during the Bangladesh Liberation War in 1971. While working as the Sub-Divisional Officer at Sonamura in the Indian border state of Tripura, Choudhury is reported to have supervised the task of providing food and shelter to over two hundred and fifty thousand refugees. He was honoured by the Government of India in 1972 with Padma Shri, the fourth-highest Indian civilian award. The Government of Bangladesh presented him with the Outstanding friend of Bangladesh honour in 2013.

Himanshu Mohan Choudhury resides at Agartala, the capital of Tripura.His father  Soroshi Mohan Choudhury was a reputed Doctor in Agartala.Sri Choudhury grew up in a joint family of East Bengali heritage with strong Brahminical roots.

See also

References

Recipients of the Padma Shri in civil service
Indian Administrative Service officers
Year of birth missing
Bangladesh Liberation War
People from Tripura